Teen Wolf: The Movie is a 2023 American supernatural thriller teen drama film directed by Russell Mulcahy and written by Jeff Davis. The film is a continuation of the MTV series Teen Wolf and features most of the cast reprising their roles, including Tyler Posey, Crystal Reed, Tyler Hoechlin, Holland Roden, Colton Haynes, Shelley Hennig, Dylan Sprayberry, Linden Ashby, Melissa Ponzio, and JR Bourne. It follows werewolf Scott McCall (Posey) as he protects his California town from a new threat.

The film was released on Paramount+ on January 26, 2023.

Plot 
Fifteen years after leaving Beacon Hills, Scott now runs an animal shelter in Los Angeles, adjoined to Deaton's new clinic, and is no longer in a relationship with Malia. Lydia works at an energy company in San Francisco, has broken up with Stiles after receiving a recurring vision of his death in a car crash, and has not used her banshee abilities since. Derek, Malia and Peter now run an auto repair shop, from which Derek's fifteen-year-old son Eli persistently steals Stiles' disused Jeep. Traumatized by the sight of his father's werewolf form as a young child, Eli suffers from fainting fits whenever he transforms, which hinders his other abilities and has strained his relationship with Derek. Malia has recently begun a casual relationship with Parrish, who is quietly keen for them to become a real couple. Mason has joined the Beacon Hills police force, for whom Derek acts as a supernatural consultant. Liam lives in Japan and runs a restaurant with his kitsune girlfriend Hikari Zhang, and they guard the urn containing the Nogitsune. A hooded figure attacks the restaurant and frees the Nogitsune, with which the figure forms an alliance.

The hooded figure sets numerous fires in the Beacon Hills forest, using a chemical accelerant, while Scott, Lydia and Chris receive visions of a ghostly Allison in distress; they theorize her soul is trapped in bardo and cannot move on until they perform a ritual, for which Lydia produces garbled instructions. They return to Beacon Hills along with Jackson, who helps them decipher the remaining instructions. During a full moon, Scott, Lydia and Malia bring a sample of earth from the ground where Allison died at Oak Creek, and the sword of the Oni that killed her, to the Nemeton, which unexpectedly resurrects an unconscious Allison. She awakens in hospital with amnesia, retaining only fragmented memories of her family and their feud with Derek and no recollection of Scott or her other friends. She attacks Malia, Scott and security guards before fleeing.

Deaton realizes the Nogitsune has been possessing Chris and causing the visions of Allison in order to trick Scott's pack into bringing her back from the dead. The Nogitsune uses the Nemeton's power to physically manifest before murdering a kitsune police officer and harnessing his energies to create nine Oni. It then approaches Allison, offering to help her eliminate Scott, claiming that he destroyed her family. She attacks Derek and Eli at the high school, but Liam and Hikari save Derek, while Allison chases Eli to the auto repair shop. Scott rescues him, and she hunts them both through the woods while in turn being pursued by Chris, Melissa and Peter. Scott confronts Allison on a cliff edge, trying to get her to talk to him, and ultimately lets her stab him with a wolfsbane-coated dagger and take him to the town's stadium, where a lacrosse match is taking place, to use him as bait for the rest of his pack. He manages to trigger more of her memories, including some details of their relationship, and she burns the wolfsbane out of him and forms a truce with him against the Nogitsune.

The Oni abduct Liam, Hikari, Derek, Eli, Noah, Mason and Deaton, and the Nogitsune holds them hostage in an illusionary bardo. While Malia and Parrish gather silver weapons with which to slay the Oni, Lydia and Jackson examine one of the fire scenes, realizing that rowan trees were burned in order to produce mountain ash. Lydia realises the culprit is Adrian Harris, who has been in hiding since his apparent murder, blaming Scott's pack for his misfortunes and plotting revenge against them. The Nogitsune releases Eli to cause confusion, while Harris surrounds the stadium with mountain ash, shoots Jackson, and captures Lydia, forcing her to watch her friends' plight so the Nogitsune can feed on her pain. Scott and Allison fight the Oni while Eli frees the hostages, and Lydia subdues Harris with Jackson's help and produces a scream that fully restores Allison's memories. Scott persuades the Nogitsune to let everyone else go if Allison executes him, and she reluctantly shoots him in the chest with three arrows, but Hikari's kitsune spirit shields him from harm. Parrish burns through the mountain ash, and he, Malia, Melissa, Chris and Peter reach the others in bardo. The reunited pack kill the Oni while Scott, Derek and Eli overpower the Nogitsune. Derek restrains it until Parrish incinerates them both, with Derek's eyes turning red in his final moments, becoming a true Alpha through his act of self-sacrifice. The bardo illusion dissolves, and the pack reappear in the stadium.

At Derek's funeral, Noah bequeaths ownership of Stiles' Jeep to Eli. Scott resumes his relationship with Allison and plans to eventually adopt Eli. Parrish has Harris committed to Eichen House.

Cast

 Tyler Posey as Scott McCall
 Crystal Reed as Allison Argent
 Holland Roden as Lydia Martin
 Shelley Hennig as Malia Tate
 JR Bourne as Chris Argent
 Ian Bohen as Peter Hale
 Colton Haynes as Jackson Whittemore
 Linden Ashby as Noah Stilinski
 Melissa Ponzio as Melissa McCall
 Ryan Kelley as Jordan Parrish
 Seth Gilliam as Alan Deaton
 Orny Adams as Bobby Finstock
 Dylan Sprayberry as Liam Dunbar
 Khylin Rhambo as Mason Hewitt
 Aaron Hendry as The Nogitsune
 Vince Mattis as Eli Hale
 Amy Workman as Hikari Zhang
 Tyler Hoechlin as Derek Hale

 Adam Fristoe as Adrian Harris
 Eaddy Mays as Victoria Argent
 Manuel Rafael Lozano as Lieutenant Ibarra
 Jesse Posey as Raymond Delgado
 Nobi Nakanishi as Deputy Ishida
 L.B. Fisher as Coach Hogan
 John Posey as Conrad Fenris (uncredited)

Production
In September 2021, it was announced that a reunion film for 2011 Teen Wolf television series had been ordered by Paramount+, with Jeff Davis returning as a screenwriter and executive producer for the film. The majority of the original cast members reprised their roles, although cast members Dylan O'Brien, Arden Cho and Cody Christian declined to return. Teen Wolf episode director Russell Mulcahy returned to direct the film.

Principal photography began on March 21, 2022, and finished on May 17.

Release 
The film was released on Paramount+ on January 26, 2023.

Reception 

Teen Wolf: The Movie broke Paramount+ records as the most watched original film on its first day of debut.

References

Notes

External links
 

2023 films
2023 drama films
2023 thriller films
2020s American films
2020s English-language films
2020s monster movies
2020s supernatural thriller films
2020s teen drama films
American supernatural thriller films
American teen drama films
American werewolf films
Films based on adaptations
Films based on television series
Films directed by Russell Mulcahy
Films set in California
MTV Films films
Paramount+ original films
Teen Wolf (2011 TV series)